Juliana Renée Thiessen-Day (born 1980 in Regina, Saskatchewan) is a Norwegian-Canadian model and a beauty pageant titleholder. She is a former Miss Universe Canada contestant and the Canadian representative to the Miss Universe pageant in 1998.

She married Logan Day, son of former Canadian Alliance leader Stockwell Day, in 1999.

In 2000, Thiessen Day was briefly the source of a minor scandal in Canada. During the CBC television coverage of the federal election, live footage of Thiessen Day at Alliance campaign headquarters was shown. An unidentified CBC producer, who was unaware his words were being broadcast live, made a comment about Thiessen Day's breasts. Since the producer's microphone was on, his comments were unwittingly broadcast to the entire province of British Columbia, until a quick-thinking technician cut the feed. Because the Canadian television networks were using a shared video and audio feed, his comments were broadcast on CTV and Global stations as well. The producer was forced to apologize.

References 

1980 births
Canadian female models
Canadian people of Norwegian descent
Living people
Miss Universe 1998 contestants
Miss Universe Canada winners
People from Regina, Saskatchewan